Calum Graham Kavanagh (born 5 September 2003) is a professional footballer who plays as a forward for Newport County on loan from  club Middlesbrough. Born in Wales, he has represented the Republic of Ireland internationally at under-17 level.

Early and personal life
Kavanagh is the son of former professional footballer Graham Kavanagh, who played internationally for the Republic of Ireland. He was born in Cardiff, whilst his father was playing for Cardiff City and grew up in England once his father returned there after leaving Cardiff City.

Club career
After coming through Middlesbrough's academy, he made his debut for the club's under-18 side during the 2019–20 season and, after a string of impressive performances, was linked with a potential transfer to Premier League clubs Arsenal and Chelsea. He signed a scholarship deal with the club in summer 2020, before signing a three-year professional contract in September 2020.

On 28 January 2022, it was announced that Kavanagh had joined EFL League Two club Harrogate Town on loan until the end of the season. On 19 March 2022, he scored his first goal for the club on his seventh appearance.

On 31 January 2023 Kavanagh joined Newport County on loan for the remainder of the 2022-23 season.  He made his Newport debut in the League Two 2-1 win against Swindon Town on 4 February 2023 as a second-half substitute, scoring the second Newport goal.

International career
Kavanagh made 4 appearances for the Republic of Ireland national under-17 team, scoring one goal.

References

External links

2003 births
Living people
Footballers from Cardiff
Republic of Ireland association footballers
Republic of Ireland youth international footballers
Welsh footballers
Welsh people of Irish descent
Association football forwards
Middlesbrough F.C. players
Harrogate Town A.F.C. players
Newport County A.F.C. players
English Football League players